The Chance Gulch Site is an archeological site in Gunnison County, Colorado, located about  southeast of Gunnison.  It was listed on the National Register of Historic Places in 2016.

It has been studied by Western State College students.

References

National Register of Historic Places in Gunnison County, Colorado
Archaeological sites in Colorado